Konstantin Alexander Karl Wilhelm Christoph Graf von Benckendorff (Alexander Khristoforovich Benkendorf,  – ) was a Baltic German Cavalry General and statesman, Adjutant General of Tsar Alexander I, a commander of partisan (Kossak irregular) units during the War of 1812–13. However, he is most frequently remembered for his later role, under Tsar Nicholas I, as the founding head of the Gendarmes and the Secret Police in Imperial Russia.

Family and career
Alexander von Benckendorff was born into the Baltic German noble Benckendorff family in Reval (Tallinn in present-day Estonia), son of General Baron  (12 January 1749, Friedrichsham – 10 June 1823, Kolga), who served as the military governor of Livonia, and of his wife Baroness Anna Juliane Charlotte Schilling von Canstatt (31 July 1744, Thalheim – 11 March 1797, Riga), who held a high position at the Romanov court as senior lady-in-waiting and best friend of Empress Maria Fyodorovna (the second wife of the Emperor Paul). His paternal grandparents were Johann Michael von Benckendorff and his wife Sophie von Löwenstern. Alexander von Benckendorff's younger brother Konstantin von Benckendorff (1785–1828) became a general and diplomat, and his sister Dorothea von Lieven (1785–1857) a socialite and political force in London and Paris. His other sister, Maria von Benckendorff (1784–1841), married Ivan Georgievitch Sevitsch.

Having received his education at a Jesuit boarding school, Benckendorff started military service in 1798 in the Semyonovsky Life-Guards Regiment. During Napoleon's invasion of Russia in 1812, Benckendorff led the Velizh offensive, taking  three French generals prisoner. When Moscow was liberated (October 1812), he became the commander of its garrison. In the foreign campaigns following, he defeated a French contingent at Tempelberg and became one of the first Russians to enter Berlin. He further distinguished himself at Leipzig (October 1813) and later cleared out the French forces occupying the Netherlands. After British and Prussian forces arrived to succeed him, his unit proceeded to take Louvain and Mechelen, liberating 600 imprisoned Englishmen on the way.

In 1821 he attempted to warn Emperor Alexander I of the threat from the Decembrist clandestine organisation, but the Tsar ignored his note. After the 1825 Decembrist Revolt he sat on the investigation committee and lobbied for the establishment of a Corps of Gendarmes and of a secret police, the Third Section of the Imperial Chancellery. He served as the first Chief of Gendarmes and executive director of the Third Section from 1826 to 1844. Under his management, the Third Section established, inter alia, strict censorship over literature and theatre performances. His aim for Russian historiography was reflected in his statement that "Russia's past was admirable, its present is more than magnificent and as for its future — it is beyond anything that the boldest mind can imagine." In his rôle as Chief Censor, he became involved in the tragic death (1837) of Alexander Pushkin in an unnecessary duel, an involvement that for long made him an unmentionable in Russian historiography.

Yet by temperament, he was the very opposite of a proto-Dzerzhinsky or a proto-Beria. He suffered from a bizarre tendency to forget his own name, and periodically had to be reminded of it by consulting his own visiting card. From the mid-1830s, his family seat was the Gothic Revival manor, Schloss Fall (now Keila-Joa) near Tallinn in present-day Estonia.
He died in Dagö.

In 1817 Alexander von Benckendorff married Elisaveta Andreyevna Donets-Zacharzhevskaya (11 September 1788 – 7 December 1857, Berlin). The couple had three daughters:

 Countess Anna Alexandrovna Benckendorff (11 September 1818 – 19 November 1900, Lengyel), married to Count Rudolf Appony de Nagy-Appony
 Countess Maria Alexandrovna Benckendorff (24 May 1820, Saint Petersburg – 4 November 1880, Rome) married in Saint Petersburg on 12 January 1838 as his first wife Prince  (28 March 1808, Saint Petersburg – 7 May 1882, Menton (Nice))

Benckendorff's notes
A recent Russian publication reveals his own view of his early life: Zapiski Benkendorfa: Otechestvennaia voina; 1813 god: Osvobozhdenie Niderlandov (Benkendorff's Notes. The Patriotic War; 1813: The Liberation of the Netherlands): Yaziki slavyanskikh kul'tur, Moscow, 2001. . This book reproduces two sections of Benckendorff's private notes that had not seen publication since 1903, very lively on the events of the Napoleonic war, correspondences with his contemporaries, Bagration and others, and associated regimental histories.

According to that book, Benckendorff kept personal notes and diaries throughout his life. One additional source for his notes, in this case from the late 1830s, can be found in volume 91 of the journal Istoricheskii vestnik for 1903.

References

Sources

Further reading
 Ronald Hingley, The Russian Secret Police: Muscovite, Imperial, and Soviet Political Security Operations (Simon & Schuster, New York, 1970). 
 R. J. Stove, The Unsleeping Eye: Secret Police and Their Victims (Encounter Books, San Francisco, 2003). 
 Judith Lissauer Cromwell, "Dorothea Lieven: A Russian Princess in London and Paris" (McFarland and Co., 2007)

External links

  Baltic nobility genealogy handbook Alexander von Benckendorff 
 http://www.mois.ee/english/harju/keilajoa.shtml – overview of Keila-Joa (in German: Schloss Fall) manor in Estonian Manors Portal

1780s births
1844 deaths
People from Tallinn
People from Kreis Harrien
Baltic-German people
Counts of the Russian Empire
Members of the State Council (Russian Empire)
Chiefs of the Special Corps of Gendarmes
19th-century Estonian people
Russian commanders of the Napoleonic Wars
Recipients of the Order of St. George of the Third Degree
Knights Fourth Class of the Military Order of William